There are several lakes named Mud Lake in the U.S. state of Colorado.

 Mud Lake, Boulder County, Colorado. 
 Mud Lake, Garfield County, Colorado. 
 Mud Lake, Jackson County, Colorado. 
 Mud Lake, Kiowa County, Colorado. 
 Mud Lake, Larimer County, Colorado. 
 Mud Lake, San Miguel County, Colorado. 
 Mud Lake, San Miguel County, Colorado.

References
 USGS—U.S. Board on Geographic Names

Lakes of Colorado